Tomás Alejandro Ahumada Oteíza (born 24 June 2001) is a Chilean professional footballer who plays as a goalkeeper for the Chilean Primera División club Audax Italiano.

Club career
A youth product of Audax Italiano, Ahumada signed his first professional contract with the club on 2 February 2022. He made his professional and senior debut with Audax Italiano in a 2–1 Chilean Primera División win over Ñublense on 30 June 2022. He became a regular starter for the club in his debut season and hhelped them earn qualification to the Copa Sudamericana.

International career
Ahumada was called up to the Chile U23s in August 2022 for a set of preparatory matches before the 2023 Pan American Games.

References

External links
 

2001 births
Living people
People from Santiago Province, Chile
Chilean footballers
Association football goalkeepers
Audax Italiano footballers
Chilean Primera División players